The 1994–95 Liga EBA season was the first one of this competition, created to be the new second tier of Spanish basketball.

Regular season

Group North

Group East

Group Centre

Group South

Relegation playoffs 
The six last qualified teams in each group played the relegation playoffs. All groups played independently 9th vs 14th, 10th vs 13th and 11th vs 12th. The losers of a best-of-five serie were relegated to Segunda División.

|}

Second round

Group E

Group F

Group G

Group H

Final Eight 

The Final Eight of the Liga EBA was held in Gijón. The two winners in the semifinals promoted to Liga ACB.

CB Gran Canaria and Gijón Baloncesto promoted to Liga ACB.

References

External links 
Liga EBA at Algosemueve.com
Group North at SD Patronato website

Liga EBA seasons
EBA
Second level Spanish basketball league seasons